Goat Island is a lake island located in Powell Lake in the Sunshine Coast region of British Columbia, Canada.

Geography
Goat Island was formed following the damming of the Powell River and subsequent flooding of the valleys surrounding the island.

The forest on the island has been extensively logged for timber, leaving a relatively young second-growth forest in its place.

References

Islands of British Columbia
South Coast of British Columbia